Otostigmus ateles is a species of centipede in the Scolopendridae family. It is endemic to Australia and was first described in 1920 by American biologist Ralph Vary Chamberlin.

Distribution
The species occurs in northern and eastern coastal Queensland.

Behaviour
The centipedes are solitary terrestrial predators that inhabit plant litter, soil and rotting wood.

References

 

 
ateles
Centipedes of Australia
Endemic fauna of Australia
Fauna of Queensland
Animals described in 1920
Taxa named by Ralph Vary Chamberlin